Gala (Georgian: გალა) is a literary competition founded under the aegis of the Tbilisi Sakrebulo (Tbilisi City Assembly, Georgia). The idea of the competition belongs to writer and member of Tbilisi City Assembly Zaal Samadashvili. The competition presents awards in seven categories.

Winners receive a copy of a Bronze Age axe and prize money (4000 GEL). The idea of Bronze Age axe sketch pertains to sculptor Gogi Ochiauri, whereas the prize itself was elaborated by Tbilisi City Assembly member Khatuna Ochiauri.

Awards
 Best book
 Best handbook
 Best translation
 Best book for children
 Best illustration
 Best literary project
 Best screenplay (since 2011)

Winners

Gala 2007 
 The best handbook: Jemal Karchkhadze for book of selected stories
 The best translation: Elza Akhvlediani for translation of The Autumn of the Patriarch by Gabriel Garcia Marquez
 The best illustration: Levan Kharanauli and publishing house Litera for illustrating Cervantes's Don Quixote
 The best writing for children: Davit Javakhishvili for book of short stories Uncle Seva's Stories

Gala 2008 
 The best book: Archil Kikodze for book of short stories Calmly
 The best handbook: Vakhtang Javakadze for Stranger
 The best translation: Maya Badridze for translation of The Man Without Qualities by Robert Musil
 The best book for children: Tariel Khavtasi for The Real Stories about Animals
 The best illustration: Mamya Malazonya for Tutiname
 The best literary project: Naira Gelashvili for Rainer Maria Rilke (works in five volumes).

Gala 2009 
 The best book: Rostom Chkheidze for monography August Children
 The best handbook: Marry Titvinidze for translation (from Spanish) of essays by Miguel De Unamuno
 The best translation: Sibila Geladze for translation (from French) of Journey to the End of the Night by Louis-Ferdinand Céline
 The best book for children: Zaza Tvaradze for Montebulsu or Ell's Wonderful Journey
 The best illustration: Natasha Babunashvili for designing The Wonderful Wizard of Oz by L. Frank Baum
 The best literary project: Vakhtang Kudava for the project Nobel laureates

Gala 2010 
 The best book: Zurab Lezhava For Child's Bite on Goldcrest in October
 The best handbook: Hero from Prime-Time
 The best translation: Lia Chlaidze for translation (from Turkish) of My Name Is Red by Orhan Pamuk
 The best book for children: Mzia Surguladze for Georgian History For Children
 The best illustration: Tinatin Chkhikvishvili for Poems by Makvala MrevliSvili
 The best literary project: Kakha Tolordava for Conversations on Jazz

Gala 2011 
 The best book: Mariam Tsiklauri for poetry book White calves (Pegasi publishing)
 The best handbook: Miho Mosulishvili for book Vazha-Pshavela (biographical novel) (Pegasi publishing)
 The best translation: Khatuna Tskhadadze for translation of The Name of the Rose (Il nome della rosa, 1980) by Umberto Eco (Diogene publishing)
 The best book for children: Nato Davitashvili for novel In and beyond fogs (Logos-Press publishing)
 The best illustration: Loreta Abashidze-Shengelia for illustrating Tamri Pkhakadze's book The adventure of Globusa and Luke (Pegasi publishing)
 The best screenplay: Maka Kukulava for Ada's movie
 The best literary project: Zaza Abzianidze for 100 books - people who changed the world (Georgian Biographical Centre)

Gala 2012 
 The best book: Baadur balarjishvili for poetry collection 'Cypresses'
 The best handbook: Besik Kharanauli for 'Poems'
 The best translation: Niko Kiasashvili - Ulisse by James Joyce
 The best book for children: Tales by Thea Thophuria
 The best illustration: Tamar Bakradze
 The best screenplay: Mariam Khatchvani For screenplay DEDE
 The best literary project: Books from Diogene

References

External links
 Tbilisi City Assembly - Gala
 Submission of Projects Has Finished for Gala Nomination The Best Script of the Year
 Gala-2007 Rewarding ceremony
 138 Authors take part in the Literature Contest Gala
 GALA Awards Ceremony in Renewed National Museum

Literary awards of Georgia (country)
Awards established in 2007
2007 establishments in Georgia (country)